The Way To Cook (1989, Knopf) is a cookbook and series of instructional videos (1985, Knopf) written by the television personality and cooking teacher Julia Child. The book was published by Knopf, the firm that published almost all of Child's work from the beginning to the end of her career. The video series was produced with and marketed by the WGBH Educational Foundation in Boston but was shot at Child's home in Santa Barbara, California.

The Way To Cook differs from Mastering the Art of French Cooking in numerous ways. While Mastering was a collaboration that co-authors Simone Beck and Louisette Bertholle had gotten underway before Child's involvement, The Way To Cook was a solo work written entirely by Child during the late 1980s. Another difference was that The Way To Cook did not focus entirely on French cuisine, on which her reputation had been built, but added a substantial number of recipes for traditional American dishes, especially those of New England, where Child's mother had come from and where Child had spent much of her life. In this, the book reflected the diversification of the cooking repertoire on Child's television show, Julia Child & Company, that had taken place since its  premiere in 1978.

The book providing a focus on "master recipes"—that is, recipes that illustrate broad principles in cooking—with other recipes provided as variations on those same themes. The book also made use of improved cookware designs and of new technology such as the food processor, of which Child was a major proponent.

In December 2009, the videos, originally available only as a set of six videotapes, were re-released as a set of two DVDs.

See also

Cuisine
Culinary art
Dish (food)
Food photography
Food preparation
Food writing
Gourmet Museum and Library
Haute cuisine
List of nutrition guides
Outline of food preparation
Recipe

References

Cookbooks
1989 non-fiction books
Alfred A. Knopf books